Rush County Bridge No. 188 is a historic Pratt through Truss bridge located in Anderson Township, Rush County, Indiana. It was built in 1901 by the New Castle Bridge Company and spans the Little Flatrock River.

It was listed on the National Register of Historic Places in 2000.

References

Truss bridges in the United States
Road bridges on the National Register of Historic Places in Indiana
Bridges completed in 1901
Bridges in Rush County, Indiana
National Register of Historic Places in Rush County, Indiana